Nevada's 8th Senate district is one of 21 districts in the Nevada Senate. It has been represented by Democrat Marilyn Dondero Loop since 2018, succeeding Republican-turned-independent Patricia Farley.

Geography and demographics
District 8 is based in the Las Vegas Valley in Clark County, including parts of Las Vegas, Summerlin South, and Spring Valley.

The district overlaps with Nevada's 1st and 3rd congressional districts, and with the 2nd and 5th districts of the Nevada Assembly.

According to the 2010 Census, the 8th district had a population of 128,218 – 0.3% below the ideal. Compared to the rest of the state, the district has a relatively high proportion of Asian Americans, and a relatively low proportion of Hispanics and Latinos. The district's population is older than the Nevada average; just over 50% is 40 years old or older, compared to 45% statewide. The inhabitants of District 8 are also better-educated and wealthier than the state at-large, with a median household income of $65,000 compared to $53,000 statewide, and a poverty rate of 10%.

Recent election results
Nevada Senators are elected to staggered four-year terms; since 2012 redistricting, the 8th district has held elections in midterm years.

2018

2016 partisan switch
After the 2016 election, Republican incumbent Patricia Farley announced her intention to switch her party registration to nonpartisan and caucus with Democrats for the 2017 legislative session. Farley justified her switch by saying, "My constituents come before party labels, and I believe this is the best way to represent them." She did not seek re-election in 2018.

2014
In 2014, term-limited incumbent Republican Barbara Cegavske successfully ran for Nevada Secretary of State. Republican Patricia Farley, Democrat Marilyn Dondero Loop, and Independent American Jon Kamerath ran to succeed her in what the Las Vegas Review-Journal called one of "three critical seats which [would] decide which party [would control] the Senate."

Both major parties held primaries. On the Republican side, Farley, a construction businesswoman endorsed by the Senate Republican Caucus, faced Clayton Hurst and Lisa Myers. Farley won with over 50% of the vote. For Democrats, Loop, an Assemblywoman and former teacher, was challenged by Garrett LeDuff, whose opposition the Las Vegas Review-Journal called "token." Loop defeated LeDuff with over 80% of the vote.

During the general election campaign, Loop said she supported raising funding for public education in order to raise teacher's wages, among other things. She had no position on Question 3, which would have implemented a 2% margins tax on business to increase funding for public schools, because she argued it would hurt small businesses. Farley, meanwhile, opposed the ballot measure, and said she advocated school choice. Kamerath, a licensed practical nurse, opposed Question 3 as well.

As of October, Loop had out-raised Farley $340,000 to $285,000. Polling showed Farley with a small advantage. Republican pollster The Tarrance Group put Farley over Loop 43% to 36%, while Democratic pollster Greenberg Quinlan Rosner Research gave Farley a smaller 46-44% edge. The polls successfully predicted the winner, but underestimated the margin; Farley defeated Loop 57-39%. With Farley's win and other wins elsewhere, the GOP gained control of the Senate.

Federal and statewide results in District 8

History 
The 8th district was created after the 1990 census. It was originally a north–south district stretching from Spring Valley up towards North-Central Las Vegas, but has shifted westward as the population has grown. The borders of the current 8th district were drawn during the reapportionment in 2011 after the 2010 Census. The new districts became effective for filing for office and for nominating and electing senators on January 1, 2012. They went into effect for all other purposes on November 7 – the day after Election Day, when most new senator terms started. The area which District 8 occupies is defined in the Nevada Revised Statutes using census tracts, block groups, and blocks. Barbara Cegavske, the current Nevada Secretary of State, is a former occupant of the seat.

References

External links 
 
 

8
Clark County, Nevada